In music, texture is how the tempo, melodic, and harmonic materials are combined in a musical composition, determining the overall quality of the sound in a piece. The texture is often described in regard to the density, or thickness, and range, or width, between lowest and highest pitches, in relative terms as well as more specifically distinguished according to the number of voices, or parts, and the relationship between these voices (see Common types below). For example, a thick texture contains many 'layers' of instruments. One of these layers could be a string section or another brass. The thickness also is changed by the amount and the richness of the instruments playing the piece. The thickness varies from light to thick. A piece's texture may be changed by the number and character of parts playing at once, the timbre of the instruments or voices playing these parts and the harmony, tempo, and rhythms used. The types categorized by number and relationship of parts are analyzed and determined through the labeling of primary textural elements: primary melody (PM), secondary melody (SM), parallel supporting melody (PSM), static support (SS), harmonic support (HS), rhythmic support (RS), and harmonic and rhythmic support (HRS).

Common types
In musical terms, particularly in the fields of music history and music analysis, some common terms for different types of texture are:

Many classical pieces feature different kinds of texture within a short space of time. An example is the Scherzo from Schubert’s piano sonata in B major, D575. The first four bars are monophonic, with both hands performing the same melody an octave apart:

Bars 5–10 are homophonic, with all voices coinciding rhythmically:

Bars 11–20 are polyphonic. There are three parts, the top two moving in parallel (interval of a tenth). The lowest part imitates the rhythm of the upper two at the distance of three beats. The passage climaxes abruptly with a bar’s silence: 

After the silence, the polyphonic texture expands from three to four independent parts moving simultaneously in bars 21–24. The upper two parts are imitative, the lowest part consists of a repeated note (pedal point) and the remaining part weaves an independent melodic line: 

The final four bars revert to homophony, bringing the section to a close;  A complete performance can be heard by following this link: Listen

Additional types
Although in music instruction certain styles or repertoires of music are often identified with one of these descriptions this is basically added music (for example, Gregorian chant is described as monophonic, Bach Chorales are described as homophonic and fugues as polyphonic), many composers use more than one type of texture in the same piece of music.

A simultaneity is more than one complete musical texture occurring at the same time, rather than in succession.

A more recent type of texture first used by György Ligeti is micropolyphony. Other textures include polythematic, polyrhythmic, onomatopoeic, compound, and mixed or composite textures.

See also
 Style brisé

References

Sources

Further reading
 Anon.: "Monophony", Grove Music Online, edited by Deane L. Root .
 Copland, Aaron. (1957). What to Listen for in Music, revised edition. New York: McGraw-Hill
 Demuth, Norman. 1964. Musical Forms and Textures: A Reference Guide, second edition. London: Barrie and Rockliff.
 Frobenius, Wolf, Peter Cooke, Caroline Bithell, and Izaly Zemtsovsky: "Polyphony", Grove Music Online. edited by Deane Root .
 Hanning, Barbara Russano, Concise History of Western Music, based on Donald Jay Grout and Claude V. Palisca's A History of Western Music, fifth edition. Published by W. W. Norton, New York. .
 Hyer, Brian: "Homophony", Grove Music Online, edited by Deane Root .
 Keys, Ivor. 1961. The Texture of Music: From Purcell to Brahms. London: D. Dobson.
 Kokoras, Panayiotis (2005). Towards a Holophonic Musical Texture. In Proceedings of the ICMC2005 – International Computer Music Conference,. Barcelona: International Computer Music Conference.
 White, John David. 1995. Theories of Musical Texture in Western History. Perspectives in Music Criticism and Theory 1; Garland Reference Library of the Humanities 1678. New York: Garland Publishers.

External links
 A Guide to Musical Texture with multimedia
 Add Texture: A web app with examples of different sonic textures

Musical texture
Music theory